Newcastle Jets Football Club is an Australian professional association football club based in Newcastle, New South Wales. The club was formed in 2000 as Newcastle United, and played their first competitive match in October 2000, when they entered the First Round of the 2000–01 National Soccer League. The club was renamed Newcastle Jets in 2004. Since Newcastle Jets' first competitive match, more than 150 players have failed to reach 25 appearances for the club.

Key
 The list is ordered first by date of debut, and then if necessary in alphabetical order.
 Appearances as a substitute are included.
 Statistics are correct up to and including the match played on 1 January 2023. Where a player left the club permanently after this date, his statistics are updated to his date of leaving.

Players
Players highlighted in bold are still actively playing at Newcastle Jets.

References

External links
 Official Newcastle Jets website

Newcastle Jets FC players
Newcastle Jets
Association football player non-biographical articles